Pyretaulax is a genus of moth in the family Cosmopterigidae. It contains only one species, Pyretaulax miltogramma, which is found on Java.

References

External links
Natural History Museum Lepidoptera genus database

Cosmopterigidae